Patient Seven is a 2016 American horror anthology film with segments directed by Danny Draven, Paul Davis, Ómar Örn Hauksson, Dean Hewison, Joel Morgan and Johannes Persson. The film is inspired by 1972 British Amicus Productions anthology film Asylum and primarily stars Michael Ironside, featuring Jack Plotnick, Drew Fonteiro, and Rane Jameson in the frame story, with individual anthology entries featuring their own casts. Patient Seven is composed of seven segments, each of which relates to some psychological psychosis, ranging from amnesia to hallucinations to schizophrenia, or horror movie trope, particularly zombies, vampires, and ghosts.

Plot
The anthology's framing device features Michael Ironside as the sadistic Dr. Daniel Marcus who has chosen to interview some sort of previously experienced trauma causes a series of patients whose psychoses he believes. Dr. Paul Victor (Jack Plotnick) permits him to interview six patients who all match his requirements, leaving the orderlies Shane (Drew Fonteiro) and Kyle (Rane Jameson) to follow his orders.

Marcus then proceeds to trigger each patient's fears through some element of their past, causing them to panic and relate their story through the flashbacks, each of which is related through one of the segments. He dismisses each patient with sharp, cruel rebukes of what he claims are their 'fake' psychoses.

After summoning all six patients, Marcus steps into the hallway to discover Shane and Kyle dead. He is hit over the head by one of the patients he tormented and wakes up in a straitjacket, surrounded by the patients who he has been tormenting. Just as he's killed, he suddenly jerks awake, revealing that Marcus is the titular seventh patient, with Dr. Victor revealed to be his doctor. After relating a story of his own, Marcus is mocked by Victor the same way he mocked the 'patients' in his hallucination, but when Victor turns his back, Marcus attacks and breaks his neck. Picking up Victor's glasses, he says that it's "Time to make his rounds" before proceeding to go on a killing spree through the institution.

Segments

Cast
 Michael Ironside as Dr. Daniel Marcus
 Jack Plotnick as Dr. Paul Victor
 Drew Fonteiro as Shane
 Rane Jameson as Kyle
 Grace Van Dien as Patient Five (Jessa)
 Amanda Graeff as Patient Four (Sarah)  
 Anna Rose Moore as Patient One (Jill)
 Sirry Jons as Patient Three (Gabrielle)  
 Daniel Lench as Patient Two (John Doe)
 William Mark McCullough as Patient Six (Damon)

References

External links
 

2016 films
2016 horror films
Icelandic-language films
Swedish-language films
Films scored by Jojo Draven
American independent films
American anthology films
American vampire films
American zombie films
2010s English-language films
2010s American films